Colonel William McLellan CBE (1874–1934) was a Scottish electrical engineer.  Born in Palnackie, McLellan joined Charles Merz in 1902 to form the Merz & McLellan consulting partnership. In the 1920s, then Colonel McLellan, he designed the Galloway Hydros hydroelectric power scheme.

References
Power from the Water, Galloway Hydro website
Charles Merz- Lessons from Boston
Tongland Power Station Turns 75

1874 births
1934 deaths
People from Dumfries and Galloway
Scottish electrical engineers
Commanders of the Order of the British Empire
20th-century British engineers
British Army officers